SH2B adapter protein 2 is a protein that in humans is encoded by the SH2B2 gene.

Function 

The protein encoded by this gene is expressed in B lymphocytes and contains pleckstrin homology and src homology 2 (SH2) domains. In Burkitt lymphoma cell lines, it is tyrosine phosphorylated in response to B cell receptor stimulation. Because it binds Shc independent of stimulation and Grb2 after stimulation, it appears to play a role in signal transduction from the receptor to Shc/Grb2.

Interactions 

SH2B2 has been shown to interact with TrkA and Cbl gene.

References

Further reading